Amber Waves of Grain is a live album by American country music artist Merle Haggard with backing by The Strangers, released in 1985. It was Haggard's third live album in four years and was recorded at the Hollywood Star Theater. It features a mix of Haggard's big hits and other, more obscure tracks. The title cut, written by Freddy Powers, is a paean to the American farmer, in keeping with the spirit of the Willie Nelson-spearheaded Farm Aid benefit, as does "Tulare Dust" and "The Farmer's Daughter." The LP peaked at number 25 on the Billboard country albums chart.

Title 
The title comes from the line "For amber waves of grain," from the song "America the Beautiful".

Critical reception

Track listing
"Amber Waves of Grain" (Freddy Powers) – 3:49
"Tulare Dust/Mama Tried" (Merle Haggard) – 3:00
"The Farmer's Daughter" (Haggard) – 2:51
"The Okie from Muskogee's Comin' Home"(Haggard, Powers)/"Okie from Muskogee" (Haggard, Eddie Burris) – 3:44
"Gone with the Wind" (Dennis Barney) – 2:02
"I Wish Things Were Simple Again" (Haggard, Tommy Collins, Russell Pate) – 2:30
"Workin' Man Blues" (Haggard)/"Always Late with Your Kisses" (Lefty Frizzell, Blackie Crawford) – 3:10
"American Waltz" (John Greenebaum, Troy Seals, Eddie Setser) – 3:09

Personnel
Merle Haggard – vocals, guitar, fiddle

The Strangers:
Roy Nichols – guitar
Norm Hamlet – steel guitar
Clint Strong – guitar
Mark Yeary – keyboards
Dennis Hromek – bass
Biff Adams – drums
Jim Belkin – fiddle
Don Markham – horns
Gary Church – horns 

and:
Reggie Young – guitar
Don Potter – guitar
Hoot Howler – fiddle
Janie Fricke – backing vocals
Tammy Wynette – backing vocals
Donna Faye – backing vocals
Curtis Young – backing vocals

References

1985 live albums
Merle Haggard live albums
Epic Records live albums